Elias bin Sulaiman (born 29 April 1986) is a Malaysian professional football player who plays as a midfielder for Sabah in the Malaysia Premier League.

Honours

Club
Sabah FA
Malaysia Premier League (1): 2019

References

Living people
1986 births
Malaysian footballers
Penang F.C. players
Sabah F.C. (Malaysia) players
Association football midfielders